Longki Djanggola is an Indonesian politician and currently the governor of Central Sulawesi. He was responsible for launching the province's joint Chinese-Indonesian nickel smelter at Morowali Industrial Park in 2015.

Djanggola was also the presiding civilian official over the efforts to apprehend members of Mujahidin Indonesia Timur (MIT), encouraging their membership at large to surrender after several of their leaders were eliminated during Operation Tinombala. A portion of MIT's leaders were arrested in addition to some who were killed during shootouts with the police, and Djanggola praised the Operation for its relatively humane approach.

References

1952 births
Governors of Central Sulawesi
Indonesian Muslims
Living people
University of Indonesia alumni
Hasanuddin University alumni
People from Palu
Great Indonesia Movement Party politicians